Topremang is a town in the district of Denkyembour in the Eastern Region of Ghana.

Populated places in the Eastern Region (Ghana)